The San Joaquin pocket mouse or Salinas pocket mouse (Perognathus inornatus) is a species of rodent in the family Heteromyidae. It is endemic to California in the United States where it lives in desert and semi-desert habitats.

Description
Pocket mice can be distinguished from similar small rodents by their externally opening fur-lined cheek pouches. They differ from kangaroo mice in not having the soles of the feet entirely covered in fur. Kangaroo rats have fur-lined pockets, but they are larger, and have a dark stripe across the hips and dark stripes on both the top and bottom surfaces of the tail.

The tail has a short tuft of hairs at its tip. The fur on the head and body is short and soft, without spines or bristles. The colour is buff, and there is sometimes a pale patch at the base of the small rounded ears. The tail is identically coloured on its upper and lower surfaces.

Distribution
This pocket mouse is endemic to California in the United States. It also occurs in the upper Sacramento Valley, the San Joaquin Valley and the Salinas Valley, and southwards to the Mojave Desert. It occurs in the "Upper Sonoran life zone",  characterized by grassland and semi-desert vegetation, and the "Lower Sonoran life zone", hot desert with creosote bush and Joshua tree.

Ecology
The San Joaquin pocket mouse feeds on seeds of grasses and various plants, carrying them back to its burrow in its cheek pouches. It may also eat soft-bodied invertebrates. It stores seeds surplus to its immediate requirements in chambers in the burrow for use at times of year when food is scarce. It may become torpid in winter. Breeding takes place between March and July, and there may be two or more litters of four to six young per year.

Status
P. inornatus has a wide range and is common in suitable habitats within that range. It seems to be secure within its range, and no particular threats have been identified except in the north, where agricultural development is destroying and fragmenting its habitat. The International Union for Conservation of Nature has listed its conservation status as being of "least concern".

References

Perognathus
Endemic fauna of California
Mammals of the United States
Rodents of North America
Fauna of the California chaparral and woodlands
Fauna of the Mojave Desert
Fauna of the Sierra Nevada (United States)
Natural history of the Central Valley (California)
San Joaquin Valley
~
Mammals described in 1889
Taxonomy articles created by Polbot